The General Police Corps (CGP) was a law enforcement force of Spain established by the Francoist regime in 1941 to conduct criminal investigation and enforce political repression. They should not be confused with the Armed Police Corps, which was responsible for the maintenance of public order.

History
Following the overthrow of the Second Spanish Republic in April 1939, the Francoist Spain initially relied on the Army in order to handle public order issues. The selection of the cadres was made between the former members of the police who had passed the purge, and also through a new selection of candidates that was made at the end of the war. The profile of accepted candidates ranged from Spanish Civil War veterans of the Nationalist faction, militants of the Movimiento Nacional or former Guardia de Asalto members.

A section dedicated to the work of secret police, the Political-Social Brigade was also created. The Minister of Governance Blas Pérez González was the main organizer of the Political-Social Brigade in its origins. The commissioner  became the head of the Political-Social Brigade, being known among the opponents for his brutal methods of interrogation and torture. The policeman Antonio González Pacheco (alias "Billy the Kid") become the right hand of Conesa.

In 1968, the workforce of the CGP consisted of 8,200 members, including inspectors, police officers and officials. In 1974, a "female group" was created, composed of 70 personnel from the administrative and auxiliary bodies, who would be responsible for various functions, such as information, surveillance of persons or searches of women.

During its existence the CGP conducted the investigation of some crimes that had great social echo, as was the case of the murders committed by José María Jarabo, or the crimes of the poisoner of Valencia, Pilar Prades. The CGP also highlighted the case of the anarchist Salvador Puig Antich, who was blamed for the murder of a police inspector and who ended up being executed by the garrote.

During the Spanish transition to democracy, on 4 December 1978, the CGP was reorganized and succeeded by the new Superior Police Corps (CSP) through Law 1978/55. In 1986 the CSP was later on integrated into the current National Police Corps (CNP).

Organic structure and functions
Organically the CGP depended on the Ministry of Governance, although directly it did it through the Directorate-General of Security. Officially, the CGP was in charge of the investigation of crimes, common offenses and conducting political repression. Within its internal organization it had two separate sections:

 Political-Social Brigade, in charge of repression against opposition movements.
 Criminal Investigation Brigade, in charge of investigation of crimes and common offenses.

Regarding questions of public order, police interventions and charges, these were under the exclusive jurisdiction of the Armed Police Corps.

Rank insignia
Although the CGP was a civilian institution, its members could wear uniforms with the rank of their category for official events.

Emblems

See also
Armed Police Corps
White Terror (Spain)

References

Defunct law enforcement agencies of Spain
1941 establishments in Spain
1978 disestablishments in Spain
Political repression in Spain
Specialist law enforcement agencies of Spain